Glencoe is a lakefront village in northeastern Cook County, Illinois, United States. As of the 2020 census, the population was 8,849. Glencoe is part of Chicago's North Shore and is located within the New Trier High School District. Glencoe has the eighth highest income per household among municipalities in the U.S. with greater than 2,000 homes.

Geography
Glencoe is located at  (42.131602, -87.761026).

Glencoe is located on the west side of Lake Michigan. Three golf clubs also buffer it, with the private Lake Shore Country Club on the north, the public Glencoe Golf Club (operated by the village of Glencoe) on the northwest, and the private Skokie Country Club on the west.

The village is surrounded on three sides by upper-income communities, with Highland Park on the north, Northbrook on the west, and Winnetka to the south. The Skokie Lagoons are located in the forest preserve to the immediate west of the village. The same forest preserve has a bicycle trail that connects to other forest preserves to the south. In the village, the Greenbay Trail allows bicyclists to travel as far south as Wilmette and north past Lake Forest.

Demographics
As of the 2020 census there were 8,849 people, 3,302 households, and 2,563 families residing in the village. The racial makeup of the village was 87.31% White, 1.04% African American, 0.11% Native American, 4.33% Asian, 0.02% Pacific Islander, 1.11% from other races, and 6.08% from two or more races. Hispanic or Latino of any race were 4.20% of the population.

There were 3,302 households, out of which 71.38% had children under the age of 18 living with them, 69.96% were married couples living together, 5.33% had a female householder with no husband present, and 22.38% were non-families. 21.11% of all households were made up of individuals, and 12.90% had someone living alone who was 65 years of age or older. The average household size was 3.14 and the average family size was 2.67.

The village's age distribution consisted of 27.9% under the age of 18, 5.9% from 18 to 24, 14.1% from 25 to 44, 30.7% from 45 to 64, and 21.5% who were 65 years of age or older. The median age was 47.2 years. For every 100 females, there were 91.9 males. For every 100 females age 18 and over, there were 84.1 males.

The median income for a household in the village was $195,600, and the median income for a family was $250,001. Males had a median income of $136,111 versus $66,384 for females. The per capita income for the village was $121,589, placing Glencoe among the 20 wealthiest communities in the United States. About 0.7% of families and 1.6% of the population were below the poverty line, including 0.2% of those under age 18 and 2.4% of those age 65 or over.

History
Opinions differ about the origins of the village's name. Some attribute it to an early resident, Matthew Coe. Others say it is named for the area of Scotland of the same name. It developed in the late 19th century around a railroad stop. Former Chicago mayor Walter S. Gurnee had become president of the line connecting Chicago and Milwaukee, and often bought up and developed land around railroad stops. Thus, one historian believes the name derives from the maiden name of Gurnee's wife, since Gurnee bought the land in 1867 and began subdivision, although financial problems prevented him from building a home there and he returned to New York for his final years. The village's first seal was based on the seal of Glencoe, Scotland.
 
During the late 19th and early 20th centuries, many elegant homes were built in Glencoe. Most notably, the village is home to the world’s third largest collection of Frank Lloyd Wright structures:  the Ravine Bluff subdivision contains seven houses, a concrete bridge and three sculptural markers.  There are also two larger, individually built homes, located nearby Ravine Bluffs. In addition to Wright, there are houses designed by Howard Van Doren Shaw, David Adler, Robert E. Seyfarth and George Washington Maher, among others.
 
 Glencoe has a Village Manager form of government. It had one of the first public safety departments (combined police/fire/paramedic). In 1921 it adopted the first zoning code in Illinois. Its land-use plan, adopted in 1940, has been adhered to with minor changes since then. Most all nonconforming uses have been eliminated through attrition and it has developed to the allowed uses outlined on the 1940 zoning map. It is predominantly a single-family residential area, with no industrial uses. It has a small cohesive central business district that provides most basic services, including post office, library, Village Hall, performing arts theatre, train station (to Chicago), and other shopping needs.

Since the late 20th century, for 20 years the village has had redevelopment of smaller homes. They have been torn down and replaced by larger homes, spurring debate on historic preservation, the effects of an increasingly wealthy demographic, and rising property taxes.

In addition to such private development, during this time, the village has completed major reconstruction of its street and sidewalk network. The village installed brick sidewalks and period street lights in the business district. Many public buildings have been or are being remodelled or expanded, including the public schools, Village Hall, library, Park District Community Center, and refrigerated outdoor ice rink. The building housing the Glencoe Woman's Club (formerly Woman's Library Club) was torn down. It was replaced by a new building, designed by Jeanne Gang, that houses Writers Theatre. The new building opened to the public in 2016. The private golf clubs (Lake Shore Country Club and Skokie Country Club) have also conducted major remodeling, additions, and reconstruction.

Representation in other media

Glencoe in the 1970s and 1980s is recalled as the backdrop of the coming-of-age memoir Lake Effect, by author Rich Cohen. This introduced his "Jamie Drew" character, based on exploits of his fellow native Mark Varouxakis.
The plot of the film Mean Girls is set in Evanston on Chicago's North Shore. It refers to Glencoe in the quote "You go Glen-Coco".
Glencoe was the stated setting for the 1983 film Risky Business, starring Tom Cruise. The movie was filmed in neighboring Highland Park. 
Scenes from the 1986 John Hughes film Ferris Bueller's Day Off were filmed in Glencoe, as were scenes from Sixteen Candles. 
The Glencoe train station is featured in scenes from Clint Eastwood's Flags of Our Fathers, as well as John Hughes' She's Having a Baby. 
The 2011 film Contagion (featuring Gwyneth Paltrow, Kate Winslet, Jude Law and Matt Damon) has scenes that were filmed in Glencoe.

Glencoe Public Library

History 
The Village of Glencoe is served by the Glencoe Public Library (GPL), located at 320 Park Avenue. Plans for the library’s current location were announced in 1940, with construction costs estimated to be around $90,000. Prior to this new construction, the Glencoe Library operated out of the former Hawthorne School at 654 Greenleaf Avenue; by 1938, library board members felt that the library should have its own dedicated building, and began developing plans for the new structure. The library was designed to “simulate a suburban home,” according to contemporaneous news reports, with meeting rooms, a local history room, and space for 35,000 books built into the original plans for the envisioned Colonial or Georgian style structure. The library opened its Park Avenue location to the public in 1941. In the 1960s, a 20 year plan was launched to enlarge the library facilities in order to double the library's capacity for materials storage. In recent years, the library has taken on multiple renovation and repair projects, including the enlargement of staff work areas, the replacement of windows, the installation of a new HVAC system, and various other interior projects to improve facilities.

Collection and Services 
Glencoe Library is a member of the Reaching Across Illinois Library System network as well as the Cooperative Computer Services (CCS) consortium. This allows for reciprocal borrowing for members of other CCS libraries, in addition to the interlibrary loan services Glencoe offers for materials held outside of the consortium. In February 2022, the library reported its own holdings at 73,528 physical items and over 1,323,000 digital items. Glencoe library’s collection is made up of adult, youth, and teen materials including books, DVDs and Blu-Rays, CDs, audiobooks, Roku streaming devices, magazines and newspapers, the Takiff fine arts collection, and a variety of digital resources including e-content and database subscriptions. GPL went fine-free in 2021. As of 2012, 90% of Glencoe residents held library cards, according to census data. 

The library offers an events calendar featuring regular story-times and children’s events; book and film discussions; guest lectures by academics and community groups; seasonal reading challenges; Book News (virtual and in-person book reviews by staff); crafting and art classes; and more. In addition, patrons are able to reserve community rooms in the library, get one-on-one technology assistance through the Book-A-Librarian program, and make use of the library’s two 3-D printers.

In response to the Covid-19 pandemic, the library closed briefly in 2020. It reopened with curbside and contactless pickup, as well as virtual programming, in late 2020. Since then, much of the library’s adult programming has moved to virtual events.

The library is supported by the Glencoe Friends of the Library. The Friends host three used book sales each year, sponsor the regular book and film discussions, summer and winter reading challenges, and various other lectures, concerts, fundraisers and events throughout the year. 

GPL publishes its own quarterly newsletter, Excerpts, that contains information regarding upcoming programs and events, information about the library, a staff feature, material recommendations and other relevant news.

Points of interest 

Chicago Botanic Garden
Cook County Forest Preserves
Frank Lloyd Wright-designed Sylvan Road Bridge (concrete) (1915 design)
Frank Lloyd Wright-designed Ravine Bluffs Subdivision entry light/planter monuments at Sylvan/Franklin and at Franklin/Meadow (circa 1915)
North Shore Congregation Israel synagogue designed by Minoru Yamasaki
Glencoe Metra station (circa 1891)
Glencoe Sailing Beach
Skokie Lagoons
Am Shalom Synagogue
St. Paul A.M.E. Church 
Writers Theatre
Glencoe Historical Society
Glencoe Beach

Local media
Local media covering news in Glencoe include The Glencoe Anchor, Winnetka-Glencoe Patch, TribLocal and Pioneer Press. Glencoe was the founding home in 1947 of the important social scientific book publisher, the Free Press, until it was sold and moved to New York City in 1960.

Notable people 

 Curt Anderson Maryland legislator, grew up in Glencoe
 Michael Bloomfield, blues musician/guitarist/composer, lived in Glencoe
 Leo Burnett, advertising executive and the founder of Leo Burnett Company 
 Carl B. Camras, an American ophthalmologist known for his research on the treatment of glaucoma, was born in Glencoe
 Marshall Chess, record producer, lived in Glencoe 
 Ann Compton, former news reporter and White House correspondent for ABC News Radio; grew up in Glencoe
 Douglas Conant, CEO of the Campbell Soup Company; grew up in Glencoe
 Bruce Dern, actor
 Nick Foles, quarterback for the Chicago Bears; resided in Glencoe from 2020 to 2022 
 Paris Grey, singer ("Big Fun (song)"); ("Good Life (Inner City song)");(Inner City (band))
 Brian Griese, quarterback for the Chicago Bears; lived in Glencoe briefly 
 Granville D. Hall, early and longtime village clerk, journalist, former president of the Louisville and Nashville Railroad and first Secretary of State of West Virginia
 Walter Jacobson, former Chicago television news personality and a current Chicago radio news personality; grew up in Glencoe
 Len Kasper, announcer for the Chicago White Sox; resides in Glencoe 
 Frank King, cartoonist (Gasoline Alley); lived in Glencoe
 Alan M. Krensky, National Institutes of Health deputy director; Stanford University associate dean; grew up in Glencoe 
 Eric Lefkofsky, billionaire entrepreneur, private equity investor, and venture capitalist; co-founder of Groupon; resides in Glencoe 
 Zoe Levin, actress and star of Bonding, moved to Glencoe when she was 11. 
 Khalil Mack, linebacker for the Chicago Bears; resided in Glencoe from 2018 to 2021 
 Archibald MacLeish, poet; three-time Pulitzer Prize winner; Librarian of Congress (1939–1944); provides ongoing inspiration to the Men's Library Club (MLC); born in Glencoe
 Fred Miller, offensive tackle for the Chicago Bears, Tennessee Titans, and St. Louis Rams; lived in Glencoe 
 Newton N. Minow, former Chair of the Federal Communications Commission 
 Harold Ramis, comedian, actor, and director (Ghostbusters, Groundhog Day, Caddyshack)
 Betty Robinson, Olympic gold medalist; former fastest woman in the world; lived in Glencoe
 Ben Savage, actor (Boy Meets World); lived in Glencoe as a child 
 Fred Savage, actor and director (The Wonder Years, The Princess Bride); lived in Glencoe as a child 
 Robert Shea, co-author of the Illuminatus! trilogy.
 James Simpson Jr., Member of the U.S. House of Representatives 
 Gene Siskel, film critic and journalist for the Chicago Tribune
 Ellen Spertus, former research scientist at Google, grew up in Glencoe
 Melville Elijah Stone, newspaper publisher, founder of the Chicago Daily News, general manager of the Associated Press 
 Kenneth S. Suslick, the world's leading expert on the chemical and physical effects of ultrasound; grew up in Glencoe 
 Clifford Tabin, Chairman, Department of Genetics, Harvard Medical School; grew up in Glencoe 
 Lili Taylor, actress (Mystic Pizza, I Shot Andy Warhol, Six Feet Under); born in Glencoe
 Paul Thomas (director) (aka Phil Toubus) actor, director
 Mike Tomczak, quarterback for the Chicago Bears; lived in Glencoe 
 Scott Turow, bestselling author; lived in Glencoe
 Peter Van de Graaff, singer and radio personality; grew up in Glencoe
 James Wilkerson, Senior Judge of the United States District Court for the Northern District of Illinois

See also

References

External links

 Village of Glencoe official website
 Glencoe Park District
 Glencoe Public Library

 
Chicago metropolitan area
Populated places established in 1867
Villages in Cook County, Illinois
Villages in Illinois
1869 establishments in Illinois